Hot dry noodles, known in Chinese as reganmian, also transliterated as dried and spicy noodles, is a traditional dish of Wuhan, the capital of Hubei province in central China. Hot dry noodles have an 80-year history in Chinese food culture; they are unique because the noodles are not in a broth like most other Asian-style hot noodle dishes. 
They are the most significant, famous and popular breakfast food in Wuhan, often sold by street carts and restaurants in residential and business areas.
Breakfasts such as hot dry noodles are available from about 5 am, and usually appear at Wuhan's night markets as a late-night snack. These noodles can be prepared within minutes and are affordable, so they are a popular breakfast. There are hot dry noodle restaurants all over the city. 

Typical hot dry noodle dishes contain soy sauce, sesame paste, pickled vegetables (carrots and beans), chopped garlic chives and chili oil. Hot dry noodles, along with Shanxi's knife-cut noodles (刀削面; 刀削麵; dāoxiāomiàn), Liangguang's yifumian, Sichuan's dandanmian, and northern China's zhajiangmian, are collectively referred to as the "top five noodles of China" by People's Daily, and in a 2013 article titled "China's Top 10 famous noodles" Business Insider reported that CNTV rated reganmian the top Chinese noodle dish. The specifics of the preparation of hot dry noodles is discussed in Wuhan author Chi Li's novel Cold or Hot, It's Good to Live (冷也好热也好活着就好).

Cooking method
The recipe for hot dry noodles differs from cold noodles and soup noodles, as the dish is served hot without broth.

The fresh noodles are mixed with sesame oil and cooked in boiling water. The cooked and cooled noodles become pliable. Before eating, the noodles will be cooked again the same way, and dressings including spring onion and sauce are added. While preparing hot dry noodles, the noodles are placed into a cone-shaped Chinese strainer, dipped briefly into boiling water, and then swirled and drained. The noodles are poured into a paper bowl, sesame paste, salt, pepper, sugar, vinegar, soy sauce, chive and pickled radish  are added, poured on top and stirred.

Origin
Summer in Wuhan is extremely long, and the high temperature causes food to deteriorate rapidly. Consequently, in the past people added dietary alkali into noodles to slow deterioration; this evolved into hot dry noodles.

According to a widely circulated rumor, in the early 1930s there was a small food stand operated by Bao Li, a hawker who made a living by selling bean noodles and noodle soups near a temple in Hankou. One day, Li poured sesame oil onto his noodles accidentally; he boiled them and added shallot and other condiments the next day, and sold them the next morning. His noodles became very popular because of their unique taste, and customers asked Bao Li what kind of noodle it was; Bao Li answered "hot dry noodles".

From then on, Bao Li specialized in hot dry noodles, which caused a sensation in Wuhan with many customers. Many cooks learned from him and specialized in making hot dry noodles. A few years later, a man named Cai opened a hot dry noodle shop at the corner of Manchun Road, Zhongshan Avenue. He named it "Cai Lin Ji", which means the rich source of money, and became a famous shop in Wuhan. Later, it was moved to Zhongshan Avenue opposite Hankou Water Tower and renamed Wuhan Hot Dry Noodles. 

Hot dry noodles is Wuhan people's first breakfast choice, we do not have to expend words for its importance to Wuhan people. Those who came to Wuhan from other places remembered Wuhan again mostly because of hot dry noodles. For Wuhan people and those who stayed at Wuhan for a while, hot dry noodles is no longer just a snack, but a feeling that you will miss your hometown if you do not eat, but when you eat it, you will never forget the taste of it.

Hot dry noodles' stalls are almost everywhere in Wuhan. The earliest formal store is "Cai Lin Ji". After a hundred years of washing and training, the refreshing and delicious taste of Cai Lin Ji's hot dry noodles is deeply appreciated by the general public, and become the signature of Wuhan snacks. But in recent years, they took a bad turn, which estimated to be associated with the ubiquitous hot dry noodles stand and their bad development.

Variety 
During the development and spread of the technique of making hot dry noodles, people in Xinyang, a city in Henan Province, developed their own special way to make them, which became a variant of hot dry noodles eventually.

See also
Chinese noodles
Singapore noodles
Dandan noodles

References

Chinese noodle dishes
Culture in Wuhan
Hubei cuisine